Rovensky District is an administrative district (raion), one of the twenty-one in Belgorod Oblast, Russia. As a municipal division, it is incorporated as Rovensky Municipal District. It is located in the southeast of the oblast. Population:   25,085 (2002 Census);  The population of Rovenki accounts for 48.1% of the district's total population.

References

Notes

Sources

Districts of Belgorod Oblast